St. Agatha's Conservatory of Music and Arts or the Exchange Building, located on Exchange Street in Saint Paul, Minnesota, United States, was Minnesota's first fine arts school, established by Ellen Ireland, Eliza Ireland, (sisters of John Ireland) and Ellen Howard. The 1908–1910 building was designed by John H. Wheeler.

References

External links

St. Agatha's Conservatory photos at the Minnesota Historical Society

Beaux-Arts architecture in Minnesota
National Register of Historic Places in Saint Paul, Minnesota
School buildings completed in 1910
School buildings on the National Register of Historic Places in Minnesota